
Tarva may refer to:

Places

Estonia
Tarva, Põhja-Pärnumaa Parish, a village in Põhja-Pärnumaa Parish in Pärnu County, Estonia
Tarva, Lääneranna Parish, a village in Lääneranna Parish in Pärnu County, Estonia

Norway
Tarva (Norway), an archipelago in Trøndelag county, Norway
Tarva Chapel, a church in Trøndelag county, Norway

Other
Tarva, a fictional planet in The Chronicles of Narnia (the other is Alambil)

See also
Tarvas (disambiguation)